The following article presents a summary of the 1940 football (soccer) season in Brazil, which was the 39th season of competitive football in the country.

Torneio Rio-São Paulo

Final Standings

The 1940 Torneio Rio-São Paulo was not concluded, thus no club was declared as the competition champion.

Campeonato Paulista

Final Standings

Palestra Itália-SP declared as the Campeonato Paulista champions.

State championship champions

Other competition champions

Brazil national team
The following table lists all the games played by the Brazil national football team in official competitions and friendly matches during 1940.

References

 Brazilian competitions at RSSSF
 1940 Brazil national team matches at RSSSF

 
Seasons in Brazilian football
Brazil